The 2022 Oregon Ducks baseball team represents University of Oregon in the 2022 NCAA Division I baseball season. The Ducks play their home games at PK Park and are members of the Pac-12 Conference. The team is coached by Mark Wasikowski in his 3rd season at Oregon.

Preseason
The Ducks entered the season ranked in the Top-25 by Collegiate Baseball and were picked to finish fifth in the Pac-12 preseason coaches poll.

Schedule and results

! style="" | Regular Season
|- valign="top"

|-bgcolor=ffbbbb
| Feb 18 || at * ||  || Fowler Park • San Diego, CA || 1–11 || Rennie (1–0) || Maier (0–1) || None || 0–1 || 
|-bgcolor=ffbbbb
| Feb 19 || at San Diego* ||  || Fowler Park • San Diego, CA || 4–10 || Mautz (1–0) || Mosiello (0–1) || Hyde (1) || 0–2 ||
|-bgcolor=ffbbbb
| Feb 20 || at San Diego* ||  || Fowler Park • San Diego, CA || 4–5 || Thurman (1–0) || Ciuffetelli (0–1) || Romero (1) || 0–3 ||
|-bgcolor=bbffbb
| Feb 21 || at San Diego* ||  || Fowler Park • San Diego, CA || 21–11 || Britton (1–0) || Frize (0–1) || None || 1–3 || 
|-bgcolor=bbffbb
| Feb 25 || vs. * ||  || PK Park • Eugene, OR || 23–5 || Maier (1–1) || Murphy (0–1) || None || 2–3 || 
|-bgcolor=bbffbb
| Feb 26 || vs. St. John's* ||  || PK Park • Eugene, OR || 16–3 || Mosiello (1–1) || Adams (0–1) || Gordon (1) || 3–3 || 
|-bgcolor=bbffbb
| Feb 27 || vs. St. John's* ||  || PK Park • Eugene, OR || 13–1  || Ayon (1–0) || McCarthy (0–1) || None || 4–3 || 
|-bgcolor=bbffbb
| Feb 28 || vs. St. John's* ||  || PK Park • Eugene, OR || 6–0 || Brandenburg (1–0) || Bianchi (0–1) || None || 5–3 || 
|-

|-bgcolor=bbffbb
| Mar 4 || vs. UC Santa Barbara* ||  || PK Park • Eugene, OR || 3–2 || Somers (1–0)  || Harvey (0–1) || None || 6–3 ||  
|-bgcolor=bbffbb
| Mar 5 || vs. UC Santa Barbara* ||  || PK Park • Eugene, OR || 4–3 || Ayon (2–0) || Gutierrez (1–1) || None || 7–3 || 
|-bgcolor=ffbbbb
| Mar 5 || vs. UC Santa Barbara* || || PK Park • Eugene, OR || 5–4 || Hattenbach (1–0) || Sloan (0–1) || Ager (1) || 7–4 || 
|-bgcolor=ffbbbb
| Mar 6 || vs. UC Santa Barbara* || || PK Park • Eugene, OR || 7–5 || Rice (2–0) || Ciuffetelli (0–2) || Harvey (2) || 7–5 || 
|-bgcolor=bbffbb
| Mar 8 || vs. * || || PK Park • Eugene, OR || 18–2  || Hughes (1–0) || Gillis (1–1) || None || 8–5 || 
|-bgcolor=bbffbb
| Mar 11 || at No. 5 Stanford ||  || Klein Field at Sunken Diamond • Stanford, CA || 4–3  || Churby (1–0) || O'Rourke (0–2) || Somers (1) || 9–5 ||  1–0 
|-bgcolor=bbffbb
| Mar 12 || at No. 5 Stanford ||  || Klein Field at Sunken Diamond • Stanford, CA || 16–13   || Britton (2–0) || Montgomery (0–1) || None || 10–5 || 2–0
|-bgcolor=ffbbbb
| Mar 13 || at No. 5 Stanford ||  || Klein Field at Sunken Diamond • Stanford, CA || 10–6  || Dowd (3–0) || Brandenburg (1–1) || None || 10–6 || 2–1
|-bgcolor=bbffbb
| Mar 18 || vs.  ||  || PK Park • Eugene, OR || 11–4 || Mercado (1–0) || Sox (2–1) || None || 11–6 || 3–1
|-bgcolor=bbffbb
| Mar 19 || vs. Utah ||  || PK Park • Eugene, OR || 8–6  || Dallas (1–0) || Kibbe (2–2) || Somers (2) || 12–6 || 4–1
|-bgcolor=bbffbb
| Mar 20 || vs. Utah ||  || PK Park • Eugene, OR || 7–2 || Mercado (2–0) || Day (1–2) || None || 13–6 || 5–1
|-bgcolor=bbffbb
| Mar 22 || at No. 23 * ||  || Washington Trust Field • Spokane, WA || 9–5 || Mercado (3–0) || Mcgee (0–1) || None || 14–6 || 5–1
|-bgcolor=bbffbb
| Mar 25 || vs. USC ||  || PK Park • Eugene, OR || 9–7 || Gordon (1–0) || Agassi (2–1) || Somers (3) || 15–6 || 6–1
|-bgcolor=ffbbbb
| Mar 26 || vs. USC ||  || PK Park • Eugene, OR || 5–6 || Lambert (3–0) || Dallas (1–1) || Keating (3) || 15–7 || 6–2
|-bgcolor=bbffbb
| Mar 27 || vs. USC ||  || PK Park • Eugene, OR || 7–6 || Sabia (1–0) || Lambert (3–1) || Somers (4) || 16–7 || 7–2
|-bgcolor=bbffbb
| Mar 29 || vs. * || 21 || PK Park • Eugene, OR || 15–5 || Ciuffetelli (1–2) || Lombard (2–3) || Britton (1) || 17–7 || 7–2
|-bgcolor=bbffbb
| Mar 30 || vs. San Francisco* || 21 || PK Park • Eugene, OR || 4–3 || Dallas (2–1) || Lepe (0–1) || None || 18–7  || 7–2
|-

|-bgcolor=ffbbbb
| Apr 1 || at UCLA || 21 || Jackie Robinson Stadium • Los Angeles, CA || 2–3  || Brooks (5–2) || Gordon (1–1)  || Jump (1) || 18–8 || 7–3
|-bgcolor=ffbbbb
| Apr 2 || at UCLA || 21 || Jackie Robinson Stadium • Los Angeles, CA || 3–4 || Rajcic (3–3) || Ayon (2–1)  || Austin (1) || 18–9 || 7–4
|-bgcolor=ffbbbb
| Apr 3 || at UCLA || 21 || Jackie Robinson Stadium • Los Angeles, CA ||  4–5  || Saum (3–0) || Somers (1–1) || Jump (2)  || 18–10 || 7–5
|-bgcolor=bbffbb
| Apr 8 || vs. Ball State* ||  || PK Park • Eugene, OR || 13–7  || Dallas (3–1) || Brown (1–1)  || None || 19–10 || 7–5
|-bgcolor=ffbbbb
| Apr 9 || vs. Ball State* ||  || PK Park • Eugene, OR || 2–3  || Klein (2–1) || Somers (1–2) || None  || 19–11 || 7–5
|-bgcolor=bbffbb
| Apr 9 || vs. Ball State* ||  || PK Park • Eugene, OR || 10–4  || Mercado (4–0) || Johnson (4–2)  || None || 20–11  || 7–5
|-bgcolor=bbffbb
| Apr 10 || vs. Ball State* ||  || PK Park • Eugene, OR || 7–6  || Somers (2–2) || Klein (2–2) || None || 21–11 || 7–5
|-bgcolor=bbffbb
| Apr 14 || at  ||  || Husky Ballpark • Seattle, WA || 7–5  || Gordon (2–1) || Engman (2–5)  || Somers (5) || 22–11 || 8–5
|-bgcolor=bbffbb
| Apr 15 || at Washington ||  || Husky Ballpark • Seattle, WA || 8–6 || Mercado (5–0) || Raeth (4–3) ||  Somers (6) || 23–11 || 9–5
|-bgcolor=bbffbb
| Apr 16 || at Washington ||  || Husky Ballpark • Seattle, WA || 6–5  || Somers (3–2) || Armstrong (1–1) || Ciuffetelli (1)  || 24-11 || 10–5
|-bgcolor=bbffbb
| Apr 19 || at Portland* ||  || Joe Etzel Field • Portland, OR || 5–4  || Britton (3–0) || Ruffo (0–1) || Somers (7) || 25–11 || 10–5
|-bgcolor=bbffbb
| Apr 22 || vs.  ||  || PK Park • Eugene, OR || 8–7 || Somers (4–2) || Grillo (1–2) || None || 26–11 || 11–5
|-bgcolor=ffbbbb
| Apr 23 || vs. Washington State ||  || PK Park • Eugene, OR || 8–10  || Hawkins (2–0) || Stoffal (0–1) || Grillo (3) || 26–12 || 11–6
|-bgcolor=ffbbbb
| Apr 24 || vs. Washington State ||  || PK Park • Eugene, OR || 7–8  || Brotherton (1–0) || Mercado (5–1) || Kaelber (3) || 26–13 || 11–7
|-bgcolor=ffbbbb
| Apr 26 || vs. Oregon State* || || PK Park • Eugene, OR || 2–4 || Verberg (4–3) || Ciuffetelli (1–3) || Brown (6) || 26–14 || 11–7
|-bgcolor=bbffbb
| Apr 29 || vs. California || || PK Park • Eugene, OR || 7–2 || Britton (4–0) || White (1–5) || Somers (8) || 27–14 || 12–7
|-bgcolor=bbffbb
| Apr 30 || vs. California || || PK Park • Eugene, OR || 8–3 || Ayon (3–1) || King (3–3) || None || 28–14 || 13–7
|-

|-bgcolor=
| May 1 || vs. California ||  || PK Park • Eugene, OR ||   || ||  ||  ||  || 
|-bgcolor=
| May 3 || vs. Oregon State* ||  || PK Park • Eugene, OR ||   || ||  ||  ||  || 
|-bgcolor=
| May 6 || at Oregon State ||  || Goss Stadium at Coleman Field • Corvallis, OR ||   || ||  ||  ||  || 
|-bgcolor=
| May 7 || at Oregon State ||  || Goss Stadium at Coleman Field • Corvallis, OR ||   || ||  ||  ||  || 
|-bgcolor=
| May 8 || at Oregon State ||  || Goss Stadium at Coleman Field • Corvallis, OR ||   || ||  ||  ||  || 
|-bgcolor=
| May 10 || vs. * ||  || PK Park • Eugene, OR ||   || ||  ||  ||  || 
|-bgcolor=
| May 11 || vs. UC San Diego* ||  || PK Park • Eugene, OR ||   || ||  ||  ||  || 
|-bgcolor=
| May 13 || at Arizona State ||  || Phoenix Municipal Stadium • Phoenix, AZ ||   || ||  ||  ||  || 
|-bgcolor=
| May 14 || at Arizona State ||  || Phoenix Municipal Stadium • Phoenix, AZ ||   || ||  ||  ||  || 
|-bgcolor=
| May 15 || at Arizona State ||  || Phoenix Municipal Stadium • Phoenix, AZ ||   || ||  ||  ||  || 
|-bgcolor=
| May 17 || vs. * ||  || PK Park • Eugene, OR ||   || ||  ||  ||  || 
|-bgcolor=
| May 19 || vs. Arizona ||  || PK Park • Eugene, OR ||   || ||  ||  ||  || 
|-bgcolor=
| May 20 || vs. Arizona ||  || PK Park • Eugene, OR ||   || ||  ||  ||  || 
|-bgcolor=
| May 21 || vs. Arizona ||  || PK Park • Eugene, OR ||   || ||  ||  ||  ||

Rankings

References

Oregon Ducks baseball seasons
Oregon
2022 in sports in Oregon
Oregon